In algebraic geometry, a cohomological descent is, roughly, a "derived" version of a fully faithful descent in the classical descent theory. This point is made precise by the below: the following are equivalent: in an appropriate setting, given a map a from a simplicial space X to a space S, 
 is fully faithful.
The natural transformation  is an isomorphism.
The map a is then said to be a morphism of cohomological descent.

The treatment in SGA uses a lot of topos theory. Conrad's notes gives a more down-to-earth exposition.

See also 
hypercovering, of which a cohomological descent is a generalization

References 

SGA4 Vbis 

P. Deligne, Théorie des Hodge III, Publ. Math. IHES 44 (1975), pp. 6–77.

External links 
http://ncatlab.org/nlab/show/cohomological+descent

Algebraic geometry